The 1997 Vanderbilt Commodores football team represented Vanderbilt University in the 1997 NCAA Division I-A football season. The team played their home games at Vanderbilt Stadium in Nashville, Tennessee.

Schedule

Roster

References

Vanderbilt
Vanderbilt Commodores football seasons
Vanderbilt Commodores football